Henri Joudiou (16 March 1889 – 4 January 1978) was a French wrestler. He competed in the freestyle lightweight event at the 1920 Summer Olympics.

References

External links
 

1889 deaths
1978 deaths
Olympic wrestlers of France
Wrestlers at the 1920 Summer Olympics
French male sport wrestlers
Place of birth missing